Heloise Bowles Cruse (May 4, 1919 – December 28, 1977) was the original author of the popular syndicated newspaper column "Hints from Heloise."

Born in Fort Worth, Texas, Bowles married Marshal (Mike) Holman Cruse, a US Air Force Captain (later Colonel) in 1946. Their daughter Ponce Kiah Marchelle Heloise Cruse, born in 1951, is the current "Heloise".

The original column was first published in the Honolulu Advertiser as "Readers' Exchange" in 1959. In 1961, King Features syndicated it as "Hints from Heloise"; nearly 600 newspapers carried the column, and, at the time of her death, it was one of three most popular (in terms of syndication) in the United States.

Her book Heloise's Housekeeping Hints was, at half a million copies total, one of the top 10 selling hardcover books in 1963. The book later became the fastest selling paperback in the history of its publisher Pocket Books.

Books
 Heloise's Housekeeping Hints (1962)
 Heloise's Kitchen Hints (1963)
 Heloise All Around the House (1965)
 Hints For Working Women (1966)
 Heloise's Work and Money Savers (1967)

References

1919 births
1977 deaths
American columnists
American women columnists
People from Fort Worth, Texas
20th-century American non-fiction writers
Journalists from Texas
20th-century American journalists
20th-century American women writers